"Hold On" is a 1993 song recorded by German group Loft, released as the second single from their first album, Wake the World. Written by Courtney Williams, Nosie Katzmann and Richard Williams, it features vocals by American singer Kim Sanders. Becoming one of the group's most successful songs, it peaked at number 13 in Denmark, number 19 in Finland, number 21 in Germany, number 26 in Austria and number 30 in Switzerland. On the Eurochart Hot 100, it reached number 54 in January 1994. Outside Europe, it hit number 2 on the RPM dance chart in Canada and was also successful in Israel, peaking at number 8, while it peaked within the Top 30 in Australia. German group Fun Factory used the same melody for their hit single "Close To You" in 1994. The music video was made mostly in black-and-white, but some scenes also have a sepia tone. It was directed by Barry Maguire.

Critical reception
Pan-European magazine Music & Media wrote, "Coming after Loft's last hit Summer Summer, this dance troupe is more than likely to match the last single's success. Hold On's up-beat tune is somewhat similar to Captain Hollywood's recent chartbusters but with a different vocal flavour. That isn't all that surprising with the Captain's producer taking his place behind the board."

Track listing

Charts

Weekly charts

Year-end charts

References

 

1993 singles
1993 songs
Kim Sanders songs
Eurodance songs
House music songs
Songs written by Nosie Katzmann
English-language German songs